Giovane Mario De Jesús (born 23 March 1998), commonly known as Giovane, is a Brazilian footballer who currently plays as a midfielder for Esporte Clube Vitória.

Career statistics

Club

Notes

References

1998 births
Living people
Brazilian footballers
Brazilian expatriate footballers
Association football midfielders
Santos FC players
Atlético Nacional footballers
Unión Magdalena footballers
Esporte Clube Vitória players
Categoría Primera A players
Brazilian expatriate sportspeople in Colombia
Expatriate footballers in Colombia